María Dolores Álvarez Campillo (10 April 1960 – 6 April 2022) was a Spanish politician. A member of the Spanish Socialist Workers' Party, she served in the General Junta of the Principality of Asturias from 2015 to 2019. She died of cancer in Llanes on 6 April 2022 at the age of 61.

References

1960 births
2022 deaths 
Deaths from cancer in Spain
People from Llanes
21st-century Spanish women politicians
Spanish psychologists
Women mayors of places in Spain
Members of the General Junta of the Principality of Asturias
Spanish Socialist Workers' Party politicians
University of Oviedo alumni